Jan Hodas (born 14 February 1992) is a professional Czech football player who currently plays for Loko Vltavín on loan from FC Hradec Králové.

References

External links

1992 births
Living people
Czech footballers
Czech First League players
FC Hradec Králové players
FK Bohemians Prague (Střížkov) players
FK Čáslav players
Loko Vltavín players

Association football forwards